Mathias Hafele (born 23 December 1983) is an Austrian former ski jumper who competed from 2002 to 2007. His best finish at World Cup level was second place in Engelberg on 21 December 2002, which was his only top 10 result. He also finished third overall in the 2005/06 Continental Cup season.

External links

1983 births
Living people
Austrian male ski jumpers
People from Lienz District
Sportspeople from Tyrol (state)
21st-century Austrian people